Eren Sami Dinkçi (born 13 December 2001) is a German-Turkish professional footballer who plays as a centre-forward or winger for Bundesliga club Werder Bremen.

Career
In his youth, Dinkçi played for hometown club SC Borgfeld. In January 2019, Dinkçi signed a contract with Werder Bremen lasting until 2022, though he was loaned back to SC Borgfeld for six months before joining Werder's youth academy in July 2019. Dinkçi made his professional debut for Werder Bremen in the Bundesliga on 19 December 2020, coming on as a substitute in the 86th minute for Romano Schmid against Mainz 05. In the 90th minute, he scored the winning goal for Bremen in a 1–0 away victory with a header via an assist from Tahith Chong.

In April 2022, Dinkçi agreed a contract extension with Werder Bremen.

Career statistics

References

External links
 
 
 
 

2001 births
Living people
Footballers from Bremen
German footballers
Germany youth international footballers
Turkish footballers
Turkey youth international footballers
German people of Turkish descent
Association football forwards
Bundesliga players
2. Bundesliga players
Regionalliga players
SV Werder Bremen II players
SV Werder Bremen players